Quinupramine (brand names Kevopril, Kinupril, Adeprim, Quinuprine) is a tricyclic antidepressant (TCA) used in Europe for the treatment of depression.

Pharmacologically, quinupramine acts in vitro as a strong muscarinic acetylcholine receptor antagonist (anticholinergic) and H1 receptor antagonist (antihistamine), moderate 5-HT2 receptor antagonist, and weak serotonin and norepinephrine reuptake inhibitor. It has negligible affinity for the α1-adrenergic, α2-adrenergic, β-adrenergic, or D2 receptor.

Clinically, quinupramine is reported to be stimulating similarly to imipramine, desipramine, and demexiptiline. It can be inferred that its in vivo metabolites may have stronger effects on the reuptake of norepinephrine and/or serotonin than quinupramine itself.

References

Dibenzazepines
Muscarinic antagonists
Quinuclidines
Tricyclic antidepressants